To gamble is to participate in gambling.

Gamble or Gambling may also refer to:

Arts and entertainment
Gambling (play), a 1929 play by George M. Cohan
Gambling (film), a 1934 American adaptation of Cohan's play
"Gamble", a song by Shiina Ringo from Ze-Chyou Syuu

Places
Gamble Creek, a stream in Florida, US
Gamble Run, a stream in West Virginia, US 
Gamble Township, Lycoming County, Pennsylvania, US

Other uses
Gamble (surname)
Gambling (surname)
Gamble-Skogmo, an American business conglomerate
USS Gamble (DD-123), a US Navy ship

See also
The Gamble (disambiguation)
The Gambler (disambiguation), including uses of Gambler
The Gamblers (disambiguation)
Game (disambiguation)
Gamer (disambiguation)